Marshan Township is a township in Dakota County, Minnesota, United States. The population was 1,106 at the 2010 census.

Geography
According to the United States Census Bureau, the township has a total area of 34.5 square miles (89.4 km), all  land.

History 
Marshan Township was organized in 1858, and named for the settlers Michael Marsh and his wife Ann. Hastings has annexed portions of the northern part of the township.

Demographics

As of the census of 2000, there were 1,263 people, 404 households, and 347 families residing in the township. There were 409 housing units at an average density of 11.9/sq mi (4.6/km). The racial makeup of the township was 99.13% White, 0.24% African American, 0.08% Native American, 0.08% from other races, and 0.48% from two or more races. Hispanic or Latino of any race were 0.87% of the population.

There were 404 households, out of which 44.3% had children under the age of 18 living with them, 75.7% were married couples living together, 5.0% had a female householder with no husband present, and 14.1% were non-families. 9.9% of all households were made up of individuals, and 1.7% had someone living alone who was 65 years of age or older.  The average household size was 3.11 and the average family size was 3.27.

In the township, the population was spread out, with 29.9% under the age of 18, 7.5% from 18 to 24, 29.8% from 25 to 44, 25.4% from 45 to 64, and 7.4% who were 65 years of age or older.  The median age was 36 years. For every 100 females, there were 105.0 males. For every 100 females age 18 and over, there were 107.3 males.

The median income for a household in the township was $62,171, and the median income for a family was $65,278. Males had a median income of $43,580 versus $30,455 for females. The per capita income for the township was $26,278.  About 5.0% of families and 6.6% of the population were below the poverty line, including 9.5% of those under age 18 and none of those age 65 or over.

References

External links
Dakota County, MN website

Townships in Dakota County, Minnesota
Townships in Minnesota